Mungy Branch is a stream in northwestern Phelps and northeastern Pulaski counties in the Ozarks of the U.S. state of Missouri. It is a tributary of Duncan Creek.

The stream headwaters arise in extreme eastern Pulaski County just east of Missouri Route MM about 3.5 miles east of Dixon (at ). The stream flows east to its confluence with Duncan Creek in Phelps County (at ) about one-half mile above that stream's confluence with the Gasconade River.

Mungy Branch has the name of the local Mungy family.

See also
List of rivers of Missouri

References

Rivers of Phelps County, Missouri
Rivers of Pulaski County, Missouri
Rivers of Missouri
Tributaries of the Gasconade River